Gerard Wilk (12 January 1944, Gliwice - 28 August 1995, Paris) – Polish dancer, the soloist of Warsaw Grand Theatre ballet from 1966 to 1970, member of Ballet of the 20th Century.

Life

Early life 
He was born in Gliwice to Jadwiga and Jan/Hans Wilk. He was raised by a single mother, with father drafted into the German army, and after the war, exiled to Siberia until 1949 for being a member of Wehrmacht. Gerard had a brother, Jan, who was four years older. He was admitted on a probationary period for a year. During this time, he had to catch up three years worth of craft under Halina Hulanicka, who studied dance under Isadora Duncan in Paris. Wilk not only successfully dealt with the backlog, but also discovered a life passion, and years later became an icon of Polish ballet.

Career 
Hulanicka persuaded Wilk to move to the Warsaw ballet school. When he passed his final exams there in 1964, he already had dance employment. He climbed all the way in the ballet hierarchy: from a member of the corps de ballet to the coryphée. In 1968 he joined the troupe of the Warsaw Grand Theater (now Polish National Ballet), where in 1970 he became a soloist. Wilk was appreciated by critics and the public. Performances with his participation became mass events. The critics wrote that he was an individuality, attracted attention, that one could admire both the mastery with which he performs the dance, and at the same time the spontaneity, the ability to convey emotions. On 26 June 1970 was his last Warsaw performance, Romeo and Juliet premiere, after which he moved abroad.

He played a dancer in Stanisław Bareja comedies – Marriage of Convenience (1966) and Przygoda z piosenką (1968) and a legal spokesman of an insurance company in Andrzej Wajda sci-fi comedy Przekładaniec (1968). He became countrywide famous after performing (with ) in TV-aired music video of Piotr Szczepanik song „Kochać” (1967). He played in ballet-themed short films: Fantomy (1967, choreo Krystyna Mazurówna), Gry (1970) and Podróż magiczna (1979, choreo ). Gry, choreographed by  earned awards on Prix Italia  1970 and Polish Short Film Festival in 1971. He also performed in ballet etudes of Krzysztof Komeda.

From 1970 he stayed abroad, unable to return for years because of passport problems. Until 1981 he performed in the Maurice Béjart's Ballet of the 20th Century in Brussels. In 1981 he decided to end his stage career. He moved to Paris and started teaching there in 1989. He also taught dance in Munich, Berlin, Florence and Monte Carlo. Once a year he came to train dancers at the Warsaw's Grand Theatre, where in the fall of 1994 he staged Massenet's opera Werther. In 1995 he appeared as the title character in the documentary film Gerard Wilk - kilka razy zaczynałem od zera (Gerard Wilk - I started from scratch several times), directed by Bogdan Łoszewski.

Private life 
In the 60s, Wilk briefly dated Spanish theatre scenographer , then living in Poland. Two men remained lifelong friends until Puigserver's death. From August 1968, he shortly dated then 23 year old actor , for several months. His longtime partner was the painter Jean-Jacques Le Corre.

Death 
He died on August 28, 1995 as a result of HIV/AIDS complications. He kept the fact of the HIV infection in secret even from his closest friends. The farewell ceremony took place at the Père Lachaise Cemetery, there was no burial. The urn with the ashes was taken to his estate near Paris by Jean-Jacques Le Corre.

References

External links 
 
 Gerard Wilk at Filmweb
 Gerard Wilk at FilmPolski.pl

Artists from Brussels
People from Gliwice
Polish male ballet dancers
Artists from Warsaw
20th-century Polish ballet dancers
1944 births
1995 deaths
Polish LGBT entertainers
LGBT dancers
AIDS-related deaths in France